The International Harvester 1066 is a farm tractor that was made by International Harvester from 1971 to 1976. The 1066 has a six-cylinder diesel engine and about 105 drawbar and 125 PTO horsepower. The 1066 is significant for its popularity, with over 50,000 units having been built in its six-year run.

Features 

DT-414 engine.
Turbocharged six-cylinder direct start diesel engine.
Hydrostatic power steering.
Dry disc brakes.
Hydraulic assist clutch
Dual pto's (540/1000).
Non synchronized 4 speed transmission with a non synchronized 2 speed range transmission, 16 total forward speeds when equipped with Torque Amplifier.
Dual hydraulics.
Engine HP 105 it has been a myth that some tractors came off the floor with over 150 hp, which was not uncommon. The 414 is sometimes known as a factory hot rod, built and engineered by Jerry Lagod who later formed Hypermax Engineering and set the milestone for the ultimate super stock diesel engine

Cabs
When introduced in 1971 two cabs were available, the "Custom" cab carried over from the previous series and the "Deluxe" cab. Both cabs could be equipped with air conditioning, heat and AM radio.

Updates
In 1973 after the introduction of the 30 series John Deere, IH decided rather than replacing the 66 series they would give the line a "tune-up"
starting with increase of about five horsepower, also IH altered the "Deluxe" cab, it now had just one window on the doors instead of two, the rear window now opened farther and the lower rear window was enlarged. The cab was now painted all red with the roof still being white. Also in 1973 the "custom" cab was dropped along with the optional Hydrostatic transmission version.

References 

Tractors
International Harvester vehicles